St Cronan's Park is a GAA stadium in Roscrea, County Tipperary, Ireland. It is the main ground of Roscrea GAA's Gaelic football and hurling teams. The ground is named after St Cronan, patron of the diocese of Roscrea, and has hosted a great number of All-Ireland Senior Hurling Championship semi-finals.

See also
 List of Gaelic Athletic Association stadiums

Roscrea
Sports venues in County Tipperary
Tipperary GAA venues